Mohammad Afand (born April 11, 1984) is an Iranian football midfielder who plays for Fajr Sepasi in Iran's Premier Football League.

Career
Afand started his career with Bargh in 2005. He joined Fajr Sepasi in summer 2011.

Club Career Statistics
Last Update:  11 May 2012

References

External links 
Mohammad Afand at PersianLeague.com

People from Shiraz
Iranian footballers
Association football midfielders
Bargh Shiraz players
Fajr Sepasi players
1984 births
Living people
Sportspeople from Fars province